The Tver Uprising of 1327 (Russian: Тверское восстание) was the first major uprising against the Golden Horde by the people of Vladimir. It was brutally suppressed by the joint efforts of the Golden Horde, Muscovy and Suzdal. At the time, Muscovy and Vladimir were involved in a rivalry for dominance, and Vladimir's total defeat effectively ended the quarter-century struggle for power. The Golden Horde later became an enemy of Muscovy, and Russia did not become free of Mongol influence until the Great stand on the Ugra river in 1480, more than a century later.

Background
In the early 13th century, the Mongol Empire invaded the Kieven Rus' and proceeded to establish a hegemony over the Rus' states. Among the most important of these was the duchy of Vladimir, the most powerful Rus' principality at the time. The extent of Mongol power was so great that the Golden Horde had the power to issue a jarlig, or decree, that allowed the Rus' princes to rule over their lands, only if they swore allegiance to the Mongol Empire. When confidence fell for the rule of the princes of Vladimir, various factions in the principality began to jostle for power, and the region divided itself into several states, including Tver, Moscow, and others. All these states acknowledged the rule of the prince of Vladimir, but the power had become notional at best by the dawn of the fourteenth century.

In autumn of 1326, Alexander, the prince of Tver, received a jarlig from the Mongol Öz Beg Khan, authorizing the prince to rule Vladimir. About a year later, Öz Beg's cousin, Chol-khan, arrived in Tver with a large retinue and removed Alexander from the prince's palace in an apparent reversal of the grant. Instead, Chol-khan took residence in Alexander's former home and began a campaign of persecution against the Christians of Tver in which numerous atrocities were committed, including rape, robbery and beatings. A rumor arose among the people of a Mongol plan to kill all the princes of the principality of Vladimir on the day of the feast of the Dormition of the Mother of God, make Chol-khan the new ruler of Tver and force the people to convert to Islam, although the verity of the rumor is disputed. The people of Tver turned to Alexander to address the issue, but he urged them to "endure."

Events
Despite Alexander's advice, a rebellion broke out on August 15, 1327 after Chol-khan's men attempted to confiscate a mare from a local deacon named Dudko; the people gathered to protect Dudko, and subsequently spread out and began to assault Mongol forces throughout the city. Chol-khan attempted to entrench himself against the mob inside the palace, but when the building was lit on fire, he perished. Tartars throughout Tver were slaughtered, including the "Bessermen," Tartar merchants. Some chronicles and modern historians believe that Alexander instigated the uprising, but this is unlikely considering the consequences that such a violent rebellion would have. However, he did not take any measures to suppress the insurrection.

The prince of Moscow, Ivan Kalita, a long time rival of the princes of Tver, hastened to take advantage of the uprising in order to assert his supremacy. Ivan allied with the Golden Horde and volunteered to help restore the power of the Mongols over Tver. In return, Öz Beg promised to make Ivan the Grand Duke and reinforced his army with 50,000 Mongol warriors under the command of five Mongol generals. The prince of Suzdal also joined the Russo-Mongol punitive expedition that came to be known as the "Army of Fedorchuk," named after the Tatar commander Fedorchuk.

In retaliation, the Russo-Mongol army took dozens of captives and burned entire villages to the ground. Alexander fled to Novgorod, who turned him away, and then to Pskov, where he was made the prince, to escape capture by Ivan. Novgorod managed to avoid the wrath of the army for involving themselves with the prince by paying the Mongol horde two thousand silver hryvnias and providing them with many gifts. Meanwhile, Ivan and his allies demanded the extradition of Alexander from Pskov, and Metropolitan Theognostus of Kiev excommunicated the prince and all the people of Pskov from the church. In order to alleviate the threat of invasion from his host city, Alexander fled once again to Lithuania in 1329, where he would remain for over a year.

Aftermath
The uprising greatly reduced the Tver Principality's power in the northeastern remains of Kievan Rus'. In 1328, Öz Beg granted Ivan Kalita the duchies of Novgorod and Kostroma. Alexander Vasilyevich, the prince of Suzdal, received Vladimir and a region encompassing present day Nizhny Novgorod and Gorodets. By granting the more prestigious Vladimir to the weaker of the two princes, Öz Beg maintained adherence to  the principle of "divide and rule," reasoning that Moscow's jealousy of Suzdal's lands would prevent them from allying to fight against the Golden Horde.

Alexander moved to Sweden after his time in Lithuania, and then back to Pskov after the city's excommunication was lifted, under the patronage of Gediminas, Grand Duke of Lithuania. In 1325, he gained forgiveness from Öz Beg and was allowed to return to his former position in Tver, however by then, the state had lost most of its influence, being replaced by the Grand Duchy of Muscovy. This return did not last long, as both Alexander and his son Fyodor were taken to Sarai and quartered in 1329.

Following the execution of Alexander Vasilievich in 1331, Ivan received the duchy of Vladimir and became the sole ruler of northeastern Russia. Favor from the khan of the Golden Horde allowed Moscow to gain power rapidly at the expense of Tver, with Tver eventually losing all influence to Moscow. However, a new rivalry was formed between the princes of Suzdal-Nizhny Novgorod. The relative power of Moscow and their strong alliance with the Horde led to a period of relative peace in Russia that was not interrupted until the reign of Dmitry Donskoy, the first prince of Moscow to openly challenge the Horde. He would later defeat them at the Battle of Kulikovo in 1380.

References

14th-century rebellions
Wars involving the Golden Horde
Conflicts in 1327
1327 in Europe
1327 in the Mongol Empire
Rebellions in Russia
History of Tver Oblast
Tver